Integrated Micro-electronics, Inc. (abbreviated as IMI) provides electronics manufacturing services (EMS) and power semiconductor assembly and test services (SATS) with manufacturing facilities in Asia, Europe, and North America. Its headquarters is located in Biñan, Laguna, Philippines.

IMI serves original equipment manufacturers (OEMs) in diversified markets that include those in the automotive, industrial, medical, telecommunications infrastructure, storage device, and consumer electronics industries. Its customized solutions range from design and engineering solutions, advance manufacturing engineering capabilities, new product introduction services, manufacturing solutions, reliability test, failure analysis, equipment calibration capabilities, test and system development, and support and fulfillment. The manufacturing portfolio of AC Industrials, a wholly owned subsidiary of Ayala Corporation, IMI is listed in the Philippine Stock Exchange.

History

IMI started on August 8, 1980 as a joint venture between Ayala Corporation and Resins, Inc. With its headquarters in Muntinlupa, they were just a workforce of around 100 employees with total fixed assets of US$3,700,290 and it is engaged in the assembly of integrated circuits. In 1982, it took a contract manufacturing with its hard disk drive sub-assembly operations and, in 1986, it started the assembly of automotive hybrid integrated circuits.

In the year 1988, the company ventured into custom printed circuit board assembly and operations and in the next years, it offered standard printed circuit board assembly services with the acquisition of automated surface mounting equipment, and eventually, full product assembly and flexible printed circuit board assembly operations.

The company moved its manufacturing site in 1995 from Cupang, Muntinlupa to its present location at the Laguna Technopark. In 1998, IMI commenced in offering hardware and software design services, that transitions the company to a total electronics manufacturing service provider. By 2001, IMI had three manufacturing sites in the Philippines.

As of 2018, IMI has 19 manufacturing sites of +287,000m² with more than 16,700 employees across 8 countries. From an EMS company, it expanded its scope to include EMS and Power Semiconductor Assembly and Test Services. IMI is also into prototyping, manufacturing, product test development, testing and order fulfillment.

Global expansion

IMI has multiple manufacturing sites in Bulgaria, China, Czech Republic, United Kingdom, Germany, Mexico, and the United States providing solutions to original equipment manufacturers (OEMs) catering for both regional and international markets.

The company began to establish its presence outside the Philippines. In 2005, IMI acquired the EMS assets of Saturn Electronics and Engineering Inc. in the US and the Speedy-Tech Electronics Ltd of Singapore. The acquisition of Speedy-Tech eventually led to the establishment of IMI's presence in China—through three facilities, namely, two in Shenzhen and one in Jiaxing.

By 2006, the company became one of the top 50 EMS companies in the world.

IMI strengthened its presence in Europe and South America in 2011 through the acquisition of EPIQ NV subsidiaries in Bulgaria, the Czech Republic, and Mexico.

In August 2016, IMI announced that it will acquire 76.01 percent stake in the optical bonding and display solutions provider, VIA optronics GmbH. This brings new technology to IMI for display solution in the automotive industry by providing automotive camera and display monitor solutions for advanced driver assistance systems (ADAS).

IMI also acquired 80 percent stake of Surface Technology International (STI) Enterprise, in 2017, through the subsidiary Integrated Micro-Electronics UK Ltd. STI is an electronics design and manufacturing solutions in both printed circuit board assembly and full box-build manufacturing for high-reliability industries such as aerospace and defense markets. It has two manufacturing sites in United Kingdom, as well as in Cebu, Philippines, and a design center in London.

Domestic expansion
In 2010, IMI acquired PSi Technologies, a power semiconductor assembly and test service provider. The company bought the minority shares of PSi Technologies in 2014.

In January 2015, IMI acquired the remaining shares of PSi from private investment firms Narra Venture Capital II LP and Narra Associates II Limited.

In 2016, Ayala Corporation announced that it will consolidate its businesses in car dealership and industrial operations into a wholly owned subsidiary AC Industrials—this includes IMI. IMI has the major role of being the manufacturing arm of AC Industrials for its wide range of portfolio. The first project was the motorcycle assembly factory in partnership with KTM AG group under KTM Asia Motorcycle.

Stock exchange listing
On January 21, 2010, IMI listed 1.137 billion common shares in the Philippine Stock Exchange.

It has completed its follow-on offering and listing of 215,000,000 common shares on December 5, 2014. IMI has 1,856,899,921 outstanding shares, as of March 31, 2015.

Capabilities
IMI is an EMS player in the automotive industry. Aside from assembly services, IMI provides automotive tier 1 suppliers and original equipment manufacturer services such as design and product development and test systems development. The company manufactures safety electronics for vehicles such as automotive cameras and airbag controls.

The company also produces access control devices design against theft and dosimeters. It is also involved in the robotics industry. In addition to these, IMI also produces medical diagnostic devices and telecom infrastructure devices.

Its technology groups collaborate with one another and with customers to develop platforms or baseline technologies in areas such as camera and imaging, motor drives, power modules, lighting systems, short range wireless, human-to-machine interface, sensors, and medical electronics.

Engineering

Design & Development 
The Design & Development (D&D) group of IMI focuses on complex automation deployments in different internal segments, business units, and external customers which includes applications in automation handling, dispensing, screwing, and customized auto feeding system for mass production. It has an extensive competencies in electronic design, mechanical design, and software development, and building platforms in the areas of automotive cameras, motor drives, and power modules. D&D provides full design services from concept to product validation. Contract design and joint development solutions of IMI is integrated in D&D, which includes power electronics, embedded systems, camera and imaging systems, motor drives, power modules, power semiconductors, LED lighting and display design, and low and high radio-frequency design.

Advanced Manufacturing Engineering 
The Advanced Manufacturing Engineering (AME) works on several industrial microelectromechanical systems-based inertial measurement unit modules, commercial laser display modules, and automotive camera modules, including the IMI minicube camera platform. AME is developing a fully automated assembly line that manufactures a complex electro-mechanical assembly for automotive safety and security electronic control at IMI Jiaxing as well as in IMI Mexico. AME is collaborating with D&D on a low cost automotive camera and power modules.

Test & Systems Development 
IMI's Test & Systems Development (TSD) expanded the development and application of fully automated test systems that integrate common backend process requirements—product marking, automated inspection, and unit sorting. It also developed an innovative test solutions for automotive electronics, EV vehicle boards and power electronics. It designed and implemented a new line of testers for power module devised and collaborated with a customer to build a fully automated tester for power train boards for EV.

Camera & Vision Technology 
The Camera and Vision Technology (CVT) group equips IMI to be ready with autonomous driving. A spun off from the D&D in 2016, the group focuses on developing vision-based products that support the different Advanced Driver Assistance Systems (ADAS) applications. In 2017, The group synced with AME and TSD to become a one-stop shop solution for camera design, prototype development and mass production.

Manufacturing

Manufacturing Solutions 
As initially an EMS company, the manufacturing arm of IMI produces products for original equipment manufacturers (OEMs). Some manufacturing solutions of IMI are automotive camera, power modules, complete box builds, sub-assembly, component assembly, precision assembly and automated through-hole assembly.

Plastic Capability 
IMI also manufactures plastic parts in Asia, Europe and North America that makes box-build capabilities accessible to its partners in automotive, industrial and consumer electronics industries. It integrates parts such as covers, housings and connectors in sub-assemblies, specializing in electronic box-build. Low pressure molding and thermoforming are the process capabilities of IMI.

Precision Machining 
The Precision Machining group is capable of fabricating components for various parts of any material for its customers. Some of the processes includes, material preparation in vertical and horizontal band saw, squaring on conventional machines (milling), CNC machining, finishing grinding deburring machine, coordinate measuring machine (CCM), and metal sheet works.

Motorcycle Assembly 
IMI produces motorcycle for the KTM AG group. A joint venture between KTM Asia Motorcycle Manufacturing (KAMMI) and Adventure Cycle Philippines of AC Industrials, IMI assembles four (4) models of the KTM motorcycles in its plant in Laguna, Philippines.

System Integration 
The System Integration group of IMI integrates different subsystem and modules into one large system. It serves a wide variety of complex build-to-print and contract design manufacturing requirements and increases value to systems by adding new functionalities while linking all functions of different systems. IMI combines complex PCBAs, electronics and mechanical assemblies with robotics into one system.

Subsidiaries and Affiliates 
IMI has four wholly owned subsidiaries that carry out the business through the various operating entities globally:

IMI Singapore 
IMI Singapore or officially IMI International (Singapore) Pte Ltd. wholly owns Speedy-Tech Electronics Ltd. when IMI acquired it on 2005. STEL, which provides EMS and power electronics, manages the China and Singapore operations. IMI Singapore also holds Cooperatief IMI Europe U.A that manages the Europe and Mexico operations from the acquisition of EPIQ NV. IMI ROHQ is also an affiliate that serves as a supervisory, communications and coordinating center for IMI Singapore affiliates and subsidiaries. It holds the stake of IMI in VIA Optronics and IMI UK which has stake in STI Enterprises.

IMI USA
IMI USA, Inc. acts as direct support to the Group's customers by providing program management,  customer service,  engineering development and prototype manufacturing services. It is also engaged in precision assembly of surface mount technology, chip on flex, chip on board, flip chip on flex,  advanced manufacturing process development, engineering development, prototype manufacturing, and small precision assemblies.

IMI Japan
IMI Japan, Inc. offers the services, such as technical, quality assurance, sales and commercial support, to answer the needs diverse range of Japanese-based OEMs. It also functions as a program management center for new business that will be endorsed to other subsidiaries. There are no manufacturing operations in IMI Japan.

PSi Technologies
PSi Technologies, Inc. is a Philippine company, that provides power semiconductor assembly and test services, that IMI bought shares of 56%, and in 2012 it was fully acquired by IMI through the acquisition of the minority of the shares.

Reception
IMI received Circuit Assembly's 2007 Service Excellence Award for the Highest Overall Customer Ranking for medium-sized EMS company category. (Circuit Assembly is a US-based electronics industry trade publication that recognizes companies that receive the highest customer service ratings, as judged by their own customers.) The ASEAN Business Advisory Council, hailed IMI as one of the 12 most admired companies in Southeast Asia.

IMI ranks 18th on the list of top EMS providers in the world based on 2014 EMS-related revenues as reported by Manufacturing Market Insider. It is also the 7th largest EMS player in the automotive industry as reported by New Venture Research based on 2014 EMS-related revenues.

IMI's Analytical Testing and Calibration (ATC) laboratory was granted accreditation for ISO/IEC 17025:2005 on January 8, 2016, by the Philippine Accreditation Bureau (PAB) of the Department of Trade and Industry. The accreditation demonstrates technical competence for the scope specified by the PAB and the operation of a laboratory quality management system that meets the principles of ISO 9001:2008.

Social involvement
IMI has a corporate social responsibility program. IMI began a sustainable community livelihood program through a partnership with ChildFund Foundation and Yakap sa Kaunlaran ng Bata, Inc. (YKBI). Along with this organization IMI, provided the women from the Parents Association of San Pablo and Bay, Laguna, with 10 sewing machines to encourage them toward self-reliance and supplement their entrepreneurial skills. The Parents Associations of both communities are now sewing blouses for Krizia, a garment manufacturer.

References

Companies based in Laguna (province)
Ayala Corporation subsidiaries
Electronics companies of the Philippines
Philippine brands